The Mad, Mad, Mad Comedians is a 1970 American animated television special produced by Rankin/Bass Productions. After the Christmas special Frosty the Snowman (1969), it was Rankin/Bass' second hand-drawn animated work to be outsourced to Osamu Tezuka's Mushi Production in Tokyo, Japan. The show aired on ABC on April 7, 1970 before the airing of that year's Oscars. It was a tribute to early vaudeville, and featured animated reworkings of various famous comedians' acts.

Production and Marx Brothers 
Most of the comedians provided their own voices for their animated counterparts, except for Chico Marx and W. C. Fields, both deceased, Zeppo Marx, who had left show business in 1933, and Harpo Marx, also deceased (though no voice was needed for him since his stage persona did not speak). Groucho Marx, 80 years old, was still playing himself. Voice actor Paul Frees narrated the show and filled in for those actors who were not able to do their own voices. Although Jack Benny's Maxwell automobile makes an appearance, it was not voiced by its usual voice actor Mel Blanc, and Frees provided the effects for the Maxwell as well.

The show included such segments as a Marx Brothers skit, which was a reworking of a scene from their Broadway play I'll Say She Is (1924). The skit included their famous Napoleon parody, with Napoleon played by Groucho. The sketch featured animated representations. Romeo Muller is credited as having written special material for the show in addition to the original scripts that came from the various comedians' sketches.

This special and Santa Claus Is Comin' to Town (released later that year)  gave Rankin/Bass their highest TV ratings, even higher than Rudolph the Red-Nosed Reindeer (1964). More recently, Behr Entertainment was in talks to produce a similar show that would feature cartoon renditions of Jack Benny, George Burns, Abbott and Costello, and Bob Hope. Thirteen half-hour episodes were proposed.

Plot

The majority of the special is an animated vaudeville-style show featuring numerous comedians performing the greatest skits at the palace.
 Flip Wilson's "Columbus" sketch (with audio taken directly from his 1967 Atlantic Records album Cowboys and Colored People) is set to animation, as Queen Isabel Johnson sends Christopher Columbus to the New World to find, among other things, Ray Charles.
 Jack Benny and George Burns take a trip in Jack's infamous Maxwell, where Jack attempts to weasel his way out of paying an increased bridge toll. 
 Groucho Marx recreates the Napoleon parody act from the Marx Brothers' 1925 Broadway revue I'll Say She Is, with Groucho reprising his role as Napoleon, and animated representations of Chico, Zeppo, and Harpo playing his advisors Alphonse, Francois, and Gaston, respectively.
 W. C. Fields (voiced here by voice actor and comedian Paul Frees) has trouble trying to prove that he is a sportsman and impress a woman to marry her daughter at the ski resort, while at the same time he also has a comical encounter with a Saint Bernard.
The Smothers Brothers try their best to cooperate in singing a song to woo a princess, but their attempt does not go as planned.
In between the skits, various comedians including Henny Youngman, Jack E. Leonard, George Jessel, and Phyllis Diller tell a few funny jokes as the TV special progresses. Also making silent cameos in the special are Dean Martin, Jerry Lewis, Ray Charles, Charlie Chaplin (in silhouette form), The Beatles, Queen Elizabeth II, Ronald Reagan, the Munsters, Jed and Granny Clampett, and cartoon stars Popeye the Sailor, Charlie Brown, Tom Cat, Jerry Mouse and Yogi Bear.

Cast
 Jack Benny . . . Himself
 George Burns . . . Himself
 Phyllis Diller . . . Herself
 George Jessel . . . Himself
 Jack E. Leonard . . . Himself
 Groucho Marx . . . Napoleon/Himself
 The Smothers Brothers . . . Themselves
 Flip Wilson . . . Himself
 Henny Youngman . . . Himself
 Paul Frees . . . Chico Marx, Zeppo Marx, W. C. Fields, Traffic Cop, additional voices
 Joan Gardner . . . Josephine Bonaparte, additional voices

Crew
 Producers/Directors . . . Arthur Rankin, Jr., Jules Bass
 Special Material . . . Romeo Muller
 Flip Wilson Segment Courtesy . . . Atlantic Records
 Caricatures . . . Bruce Stark
 Continuity Design . . . Don Duga
 Animation Production . . . Mushi Productions
 Animation Supervisor . . . Steve Nakagawa
 Animation . . . Osamu Dezaki, Sadao Miyamoto, Akio Sugino (all uncredited)
 Editorial Supervision . . . Irwin Goldress
 Title Song . . . Maury Laws, Jules Bass
 Music . . . Maury Laws

References

External links
 

1970 animated films
1970 films
1970 in American television
1970 television specials
1970s American animated films
1970s American television specials
1970s animated short films
American Broadcasting Company television specials
1970s animated television specials
Cultural depictions of W. C. Fields
Cultural depictions of the Marx Brothers
Films scored by Maury Laws
Television shows directed by Jules Bass
Television shows directed by Arthur Rankin Jr.
Rankin/Bass Productions television specials
1970s in comedy